Don Vesco (April 8, 1939 – December 16, 2002) was an American businessman and motorcycle racer who held multiple motorcycle land-speed and wheel-driven land speed records. In his lifetime, he set 18 motorcycle and 6 automobile speed records.

His accomplishments recognized by the American Motorcyclist Association include winning the United States motorcycle Grand Prix 500 cc class in 1963, operating a California motorcycle dealership that sponsored up to 60 racers at a time, and setting a number of motorcycle and automobile land speed records.

Speed records

Brother Rick improved the "Turbinator," and current Vesco driver Dave Spangler averaged  in 2018.

Vesco died in 2002 from prostate cancer.

Other designs

In addition to his own land speed record vehicles, Vesco had a consulting role in other streamlined vehicles. One was Max Lambky's Vincent-engined Lambky Liner streamliner. Another was  the "Project 200" streamliner designed by his business partner, Matt Guzzetta, and speed tested by Vesco at El Mirage Dry Lake. Project 200 both competed in the Craig Vetter Fuel Economy Challenge, and in 1983, performed an American coast-to-coast transit without refueling, sponsored by Motorcyclist magazine.

Vesco also designed aftermarket motorcycle accessories including extended range gas tanks for offroad motorcycles sold through Don Vesco Products, which also had a line of motorcycle fairings called "Rabid Transit" designed by Guzzetta.

Honors
Vesco was inducted to the Motorcycle Hall of Fame in 1999 and posthumously inducted to the Motorsports Hall of Fame of America in 2004.

Collections
Vesco's "Big Red" #11 streamliner is part of the Barber Vintage Motorsports Museum collection. His #14 streamliner, with a fiberglass body molded around a 22-inch aircraft drop tank, powered by twin supercharged Yamaha XS650 SOHC engines, is on display at the National Motorcycle Museum in Iowa. The "Project 200" fuel efficiency contest streamliner was on display at the San Diego Automotive Museum as of 2011.

Notes and references

Notes

Sources
Speed records

Other projects

 (Rabid Transit fairing)

Further reading

External links

 
Motorcycle land speed record people
American motorcycle racers
American motorcycle designers
Bonneville 300 MPH Club members
Racing drivers from San Diego
1939 births
2002 deaths
Deaths from cancer in California
Deaths from prostate cancer
People from Loma Linda, California
Motorcycle racers from San Diego